Caique Silva Rocha (born January 10, 1988 in Salvador, Bahia), known as just Caíque, is a Brazilian footballer who can play a variety of midfield roles and a journeyman. He currently plays for Ferroviário.

Career
First discovered by the club Vitória, Caique began his professional career in 2007, helping Bahian back to the top division of Brazilian football. In 2008, after limited playing time for the Lions, he moved clubs to Atlético Paranaense.

After a short spell at Oeste, Caique signed with Guarani of Serie B in 2009. Another transfer to Campinas saw him assist in their promotion to Serie A, after which he was transferred to the Vasco da Gama for the 2010 season.

In 2013, he signed a three-year contract with Ulsan Hyundai.

However, this deal ended prematurely and Rocha found himself playing for Chinese League One side, Chengdu Tiancheng.

Career statistics

References

External links
 ogol.com.br

1987 births
Living people
Brazilian footballers
Club Athletico Paranaense players
CR Vasco da Gama players
Avaí FC players
Esporte Clube Vitória players
Guarani FC players
Gyeongnam FC players
Ulsan Hyundai FC players
Chengdu Tiancheng F.C. players
Goias players
Grêmio Novorizontino players
Centro Sportivo Alagoano players
Joinville Esporte Clube players
Ferroviário Atlético Clube (CE) players
Campeonato Brasileiro Série A players
Campeonato Brasileiro Série B players
Campeonato Brasileiro Série D players
K League 1 players
China League One players
Brazilian expatriate footballers
Expatriate footballers in South Korea
Brazilian expatriate sportspeople in South Korea
Expatriate footballers in China
Brazilian expatriate sportspeople in China
Association football midfielders
Sportspeople from Salvador, Bahia